A referendum on the use of nuclear power was held in Austria on 5 November 1978. Voters were asked whether they approve a law allowing the peaceful use of nuclear power, particularly relating to the start-up of the Zwentendorf Nuclear Power Plant. Voters narrowly rejected it, with 50.5% voting against. As a result, although the Power Plant was finished, it was never operated and has since been dismantled.

Voter turnout was 64.1%.

Results

By state

References

1978 elections in Austria
Referendums in Austria
1978 referendums
Nuclear power in Austria
Nuclear power referendums
November 1978 events in Europe